Patrick Lavery (28 February 1884 – May 1922) was an English professional footballer who played in the Football League for Hull City as an outside left.

Personal life 
Born in Walker, Lavery grew up in County Tyrone and Blackhill. As of 1914, he was working as a plater's assistant at the Armstrong Whitworth shipyard in Newcastle upon Tyne. Lavery served in the Yorkshire Regiment during the First World War and was seriously wounded during the course of his service.

Career statistics

References 

1884 births
Military personnel from Newcastle upon Tyne
People from Hebburn
Footballers from Tyne and Wear
English footballers
Association football outside forwards
English Football League players
British Army personnel of World War I
1922 deaths
Hull City A.F.C. players
West Stanley F.C. players
South Shields F.C. (1889) players
Bedlington United A.F.C. players
Green Howards soldiers